Glen Logan (born March 26, 1998) is an American football defensive tackle for the Houston Roughnecks of the XFL. He played college football at LSU.

High school career
Logan played football at Destrehan High School in Destrehan, Louisiana under head coach Stephen Robicheaux, where he played defensive tackle. He earned All-USA Louisiana First-team defense honors and also first-team Louisiana 5A all-state honors his senior season, while recording 54.5 tackles, 5.5 tackles for loss, and four sacks. He was a consensus four-star pick by 247Sports, ESPN, Rivals.com, and Scout.com. Rivals rated Logan as the nation's number sixty-nine overall prospect, the number seven defensive tackle in the nation, and the number two overall player in Louisiana.

College career
Logan played defensive tackle at LSU for six-seasons from 2016 to 2021 appearing in fifty-one games with thirty-seven starts. He was a five-year letterwinner and four-year starter on the defensive line for the Tigers. He redshirted his freshman year in 2016 and was granted a sixth year of eligibility in 2021 due to NCAA rules changes caused by the COVID-19 pandemic. Logan finished his career with 110 tackles, 10.0 tackles for loss, and 7.0 sacks and won a national championship with LSU during his 2019 junior season.

Professional career

Logan went undrafted in the 2022 NFL Draft.

Cleveland Browns
Logan was signed by the Cleveland Browns as an undrafted free agent following the 2022 NFL Draft. Logan was waived by the Browns on August 29, 2022.

Arlington Renegades
Logan was selected by the Arlington Renegades in the 2023 XFL Draft.

Professional wrestling

WWE
On December 8, 2021, it was reported that Logan signed a Name, Image and Likeness (NIL) agreement with World Wrestling Entertainment, Inc (WWE). He was one of fifteen athletes to become part of the WWE's "Next in Line" program, which was established to develop potential future superstars and enhance WWE's talent development process. The program features access to the WWE Performance Center in addition to other resources across the organization. Following the completion of the program, the athlete may be offered a WWE contract.

References

External links
LSU bio

1998 births
Living people
African-American players of American football
American football defensive tackles
Destrehan High School alumni
Players of American football from Louisiana
People from Destrehan, Louisiana
People from Kenner, Louisiana
LSU Tigers football players
Cleveland Browns players
Arlington Renegades players
21st-century African-American sportspeople